The Legends Rock Dubai is the last event in the Outback Champions Series for senior tennis players. It is held each year in November in Dubai, UAE.

Players who have participated in this event include Anders Järryd, Björn Borg, Cédric Pioline, Guy Forget, Jim Courier,

Recurring sporting events established in 2007
Tennis tournaments in the United Arab Emirates
Champions Series (senior men's tennis tour)
Sports competitions in Dubai
2007 establishments in the United Arab Emirates